Ye is a town in the southern end of Mon State, Myanmar (Burma). It is the principal town of Ye Township of Mawlamyine District. The town is located by the Ye River as it drains into the Gulf of Martaban, and is surrounded by Tenasserim Hills in the east. It has warm, moderate weather. The town's economy is mainly based on betel nut, rubber, fishery production, and trade. Ye is on the Mawlamyaing-Dawei rail line, and has a seaport. The majority of the people are ethnic Mon people. Ye is a center of Mon language education. As of 2014, it had a population of 34,430.

There was a flood in August 2011 after a torrent of rain (12.6 inches on 1 August). 2,000 houses were flooded and some schools and markets were closed because of it.

Climate

Ye has a tropical monsoon climate (Köppen climate classification Am). Temperatures are hot throughout the year, although maximum temperatures in the monsoon months are depressed by heavy cloud and rain. There is a winter dry season (November–April) and a summer wet season (May–October). Torrential rain falls from June to September, with over  falling in August alone.

Gallery

See also
 Mon State

References

Township capitals of Myanmar
Populated places in Mon State
Old Cities of Mon people